The lanterne rouge is the competitor in last place in the Tour de France.  The phrase comes from the French for "Red Lantern" and refers to the red lantern hung on the rear vehicle of a passenger railway train or the brake van of a freight train, which signalmen would look for in order to make sure none of the couplings had become disconnected.

Cultural uses
In the Tour de France the rider who finishes last, rather than dropping out along the way, is accorded the distinction of lanterne rouge. Because of the popularity it affords, riders may compete for the last position rather than settling for a place near the back. Often the rider who comes last is remembered while those a few places ahead are forgotten.  The revenue the last rider will generate from later appearance fees can be greater than if he had finished second to last, although this was more true when riders still made much of their income from post-Tour criteriums.

In the 1979 Tour de France, Gerhard Schönbacher and Philippe Tesnière were on the last two spots in the general classification, less than one minute apart. Tesnière had already finished last in the 1978 Tour, so he was aware of the publicity associated with being the lanterne rouge.
In the 21st stage, a time trial, Tesnière therefore rode slowly. The winner of the time trial, Bernard Hinault, took 1 hour, 8 minutes and 53 seconds to cover the 48.8 km, Schönbacher used 1 hour, 21 minutes and 52 seconds, while Tesniere rode it in 1 hour, 23 minutes and 32 seconds; both were slower than all other cyclists. Tesnière's time was more than 20% slower than Hinault's, which meant that he had missed the time cut, and was taken out of the race.

The Tour organisation did not like the attention that the lanterne rouge received, and for the 1980 Tour devised a rule to make it more difficult to finish last: between the 14th and the 20th stage, the rider last in the general classification was removed from the race. Still, Schönbacher managed to finish last in that race. Before the Tour, Schönbacher was promised by his sponsor that he would receive extra money if he finished in last place. After the last stage of the Tour, his team leader Patrick Lefevere told Schönbacher that he would not get the money, and after a heated discussion, Schönbacher was fired.

Red lantern holders are often great  sprinters or great riders of shorter races who are not fit enough for such a long race as the Tour de France, or who try to finish the race despite injury, as in the case of Sam Bennett, who finished last after breaking a finger in the opening stage of the 2016 Tour, but eventually won the green jersey in  2020.

In 2018 Lawson Craddock became the first rider in the history of the Tour de France to have the distinction of lanterne rouge for all stages of the entire tour. He crashed in the 1st stage resulting in facial lacerations and a fractured scapula. Despite his left eye being smashed and the pain of fractured scapula, he continued to race and finished the stage which led to a picture of his bloodied and grimacing face going viral. Later that day he posted an announcement on social media that he was donating $100 for every stage he finished to the Greater Houston Cycling Association to help rebuild the Alkek Velodrome that had been damaged by Hurricane Harvey. A GoFundMe page was also setup for donations to go directly to the velodrome. Craddock continued to ride all the remaining stages which garnered much publicity for the fundraising efforts and eventually over US$250,000 being raised for the cause. In this case the lanterne rouge has been described as being worn as "a badge of courage" and winning it as "a triumph of sporting endeavour".

Lanternes rouges of the Tour de France

 1903 
 1904 
 1905 
 1906 
 1907 
 1908 
 1909 
 1910 
 1911 
 1912 
 1913 
 1914 
 1915–18: no tour due to World War I
 1919 
 1920 
 1921 
 1922 
 1923 
 1924 
 1925 
 1926 
 1927 
 1928 
 1929 
 1930 
 1931 
 1932 
 1933 
 1934 
 1935 
 1936 
 1937 
 1938 
 1939 
 1940–46: no tour due to World War II
 1947 
 1948 
 1949 
 1950 
 1951 
 1952 
 1953 
 1954 
 1955 
 1956 
 1957 
 1958 
 1959 
 1960 
 1961 
 1962 
 1963 
 1964 
 1965 
 1966 
 1967 
 1968 
 1969 
 1970 
 1971 
 1972 
 1973 
 1974 
 1975 
 1976 
 1977 
 1978 
 1979 
 1980 
 1981 
 1982 
 1983 
 1984 
 1985 
 1986 
 1987 
 1988 
 1989 
 1990 
 1991 
 1992 
 1993 
 1994 
 1995 
 1996 
 1997 
 1998 
 1999 
 2000 
 2001 
 2002 
 2003 
 2004 
 2005 
 2006 
 2007 
 2008 
 2009 
 2010 
 2011 
 2012 
 2013 
 2014 
 2015 
 2016 
 2017 
 2018 
 2019 
 2020 
 2021 
 2022

Multiple lanternes rouges of the Tour de France

Spain's Igor Flores received the lanterne rouge in 2002, and his brother Iker Flores received it in 2005.

Lanternes rouges of the Tour de France by nationality

The first 24 red lanterns went to France between 1903 and 1930, with the French total reaching 53 in 2015.  The rest of the world received its first red lantern in 1931, and eventually equaled France's total of 53 in 2019, and overtook it with 54 in 2020.

See also
 Maglia nera
 Wooden spoon
 Iditarod Trail Sled Dog Race

References

Tour de France classifications and awards
French words and phrases
Ironic and humorous awards